Robert McCawley Short (October 4, 1904 in Steilacoom, Washington - February 22, 1932, in Suzhou, Jiangsu, China) was an American aviator, United States Army Air Forces pilot, and Republic of China Air Force Academy instructor. Born in Steilacoom, Washington, his family soon moved to Tacoma, Washington. On February 22, 1932, when flying a Boeing 218 from Shanghai to Nanjing, Short was boxed by six Japanese fighters. He first shot down a Japanese fighter and killed a Japanese commander, but later was shot down by the Japanese and crashed into a small lake (:zh:镬底潭) of Wusong River, in Wu County, Jiangsu, China. He was the first foreign pilot killed in the Second Sino-Japanese War, and the first American casualty in operations against Japan, nine years before the attack on Pearl Harbor.

In May 1932, Wu County erected an obelisk at the crash site in memory of his sacrifice. The obelisk was eroded by water due to its proximity to the river, and was later reconstructed in 1985. Short Memorial was also built in that year. In 1999, a statue of Robert Short was established in the same place. In October 2009, the Memorial moved to Jiangbin Park (江滨公园, River Shore Park) in Xietang Subdistrict of Suzhou Industrial Park. On September 1, 2014, Ministry of Civil Affairs of the People's Republic of China listed Short as a Famous Anti-Japanese Hero (:zh:著名抗日英烈和英雄群体名录).

In 2018, Short was also honored at Stadium High School's annual Memorial Day Recognition, where he graduated from in 1925.

See also 
 Toshio Kuroiwa
 The First of the Flying Tigers; Bob Short, The Hero of Suzhou

References 

1904 births
1932 deaths
American aviators
United States Army Air Forces pilots
Republic of China Air Force personnel
People from Tacoma, Washington
Suzhou Industrial Park
History of Suzhou
People from Steilacoom, Washington
Aviators killed by being shot down